Rollinia centrantha is a species of plant in the Annonaceae family. It is found in Ecuador and possibly Peru.

References

centrantha
Flora of Ecuador
Data deficient plants
Taxonomy articles created by Polbot
Taxobox binomials not recognized by IUCN